Enoc Aguado Farfán (1883 – 1964) was a Nicaraguan politician and attorney. He was the Vice President of Nicaragua of President José María Moncada from January 1929 to January 1933.

Aguado was president of the Chamber of Deputies 1924–1925 and 1942–1943. In 1944 he founded with other dissidents the Independent Liberal Party. He was the presidential candidate of Chamorro-led conservatives against Somoza's candidate in the 1947 Nicaraguan general election.

References

1883 births
1964 deaths
Vice presidents of Nicaragua
Presidents of the Chamber of Deputies (Nicaragua)
Liberal Party (Nicaragua) politicians